This list includes daily and weekly newspapers owned by GateHouse Media Inc.

Alabama
Gatehouse publishes two daily newspapers in Alabama
 
 The Gadsden Times, daily, of Gadsden
 The Tuscaloosa News, daily, of Tuscaloosa

Arizona 
Gatehouse publishes one weekly newspapers in Arizona
 
 The Arizona Capitol Times of Phoenix

Arkansas 
GateHouse publishes four daily newspapers, 17 paid weeklies and 12 free weeklies (not listed) in Arkansas, in addition to one shopper publications (not listed):

 Pine Bluff Commercial  of Pine Bluff
 Southwest Times Record  of Fort Smith
 Stuttgart Daily Leader  of Stuttgart
 Log Cabin Democrat of Conway
 Greenwood Democrat, paid weekly, of Greenwood
 Boonville Democrat, paid weekly, of Booneville
 Cabot Star-Herald, paid weekly, of Cabot
 Charleston Express, paid weekly, of Greenwood
 Press Argus-Courier, paid weekly, of Van Buren
 Alma Journal, paid weekly, of Van Buren
 The Jacksonville Patriot, paid weekly, of Jacksonville
 Maumelle Monitor, paid weekly, of Maumelle
 Paris Express, paid weekly, of Paris
 Gurdon Times, paid weekly, of Gurdon
 Newport Independent, paid weekly, of Newport
 The Sun-Times, paid weekly, of Heber Springs
 The White Hall Journal, paid weekly, of White Hall

 The Van Buren County Democrat, paid weekly, of Van Buren County
The Helena-West Helena World of Helena
Hot Springs Village Voice of Hot Springs Village

California
GateHouse publishes five daily newspapers and six paid weeklies in California, in addition to nine free weeklies and shopper publications (not listed) associated with its newspaper products, and the Local Yellow Pages in Sacramento:

 Daily Press of Victorville
 The Daily Independent  of Ridgecrest
 Desert Dispatch, daily, of Victorville
 The Record, daily, of Stockton
 Siskiyou Daily News  of Yreka
 Taft Midway Driller, weekly, of Taft
 Mt. Shasta Area Newspapers weeklies:
 The Dunsmuir News of Dunsmuir
 Mount Shasta Herald of Mount Shasta
 Weed Press of Weed
 Lucerne Valley Leader, paid weekly, of Lucerne Valley
 The Gridley Herald, weekly, of Gridley

Colorado
GateHouse publishes one daily newspaper and three paid weeklies in Colorado:

 Ag Journal, weekly, of La Junta
 Bent County Democrat, weekly, of Las Animas
 Fowler Tribune, weekly, of Fowler
 The Pueblo Chieftain, of Pueblo
 The Tribune-Democrat  of La Junta

Connecticut
 The Bulletin  of Norwich, Connecticut

Delaware
GateHouse publishes six weekly newspapers in Delaware:

 The Community News of Hockessin
 Dover Post of Dover
 Middletown Transcript of Middletown
 Milford Beacon of Milford
 Smyrna/Clayton Sun-Times of Smyrna
 Sussex Countian of Georgetown

Florida 
GateHouse publishes 15 newspapers in Florida:

 The Gainesville Sun of Gainesville, Florida
 The Destin Log of Destin, Florida
 The Walton Sun of Walton County, Florida
 Crestview News Bulletin of Crestview, Florida
 News Journal of Daytona Beach, Florida
 Florida Times-Union of Jacksonville, Florida
 Northwest Florida Daily News of Ft. Walton Beach, Florida
 Santa Rosa Press Gazette of Santa Rosa Beach, Florida
 Panama City News Herald of Panama City, Florida
 Washington County News of Washington County, Florida
 Holmes County Advertiser of Holmes County, Florida
 Apalachicola Times of Apalachicola, Florida
 The Star of Port St. Joe, Florida
 The Palm Beach Post of West Palm Beach, Florida
 The Palm Beach Daily News of Palm Beach, Florida
 The Sarasota Herald Tribune of Sarasota, FL (since 2015)
 Naples Daily News, FL (since 2019)

Georgia
GateHouse Media publishes three daily and five weekly newspapers in Georgia.

 Athens Banner-Herald, daily, of Athens
 Augusta Chronicle, daily, of Augusta
 Savannah Morning News, daily, of Savannah
 The Columbia County News-Times, weekly, of Evans
 The News and Farmer, weekly, of Louisville
 Bryan County Now, weekly, of Richmond Hill
 Effingham Now, weekly, of Rincon
 Sylvania Telephone, weekly, of Sylvania

Illinois
GateHouse Media Illinois publishes 21 daily newspapers and 55 weeklies in Illinois, in addition to numerous shopper publications:

Central Illinois

Henry County 
 Star Courier  of Kewanee
 Henry County weekly newspapers:
 Cambridge Chronicle of Cambridge
 Galva News of Galva
 Geneseo Republic of Geneseo
 Orion Gazette of Orion
These weekly papers were combined in March 2019, under the name Henry County Republic, and headquartered in the Geneseo location.

Peoria-Canton area
 Daily Ledger  of Canton
 Journal Star  of Peoria
 Bradley Hoops, weekly, of Peoria
 Pekin Daily Times  of Pekin
 TimesNewspapers weeklies:
 Chillicothe Times-Bulletin  of Chillicothe and Dunlap
 Washington Times-Reporter  of Washington
 Woodford Times  of Woodford County
 East Peoria Times-Courier  of East Peoria
 Morton Times-News  of Morton
Western Illinois (Forgottonia)
 The McDonough County Voice  of Macomb
 The Register-Mail  of Galesburg
 Knox County Neighbors, weekly, of Galesburg (formerly The Paper)
 Daily Review Atlas  of Monmouth
 Eagle Publications weeklies:
 Argus Sentinel of Abingdon and Avon
 Eagle-Scribe of Augusta
 Macomb Eagle of Macomb
 Roseville Independent of Roseville
 Other weekly newspapers:
 The Times Record of Aledo
 Oquawka Current of Oquawka

Other newspapers
 The Daily Leader  of Pontiac
 Home Times, weekly, of Flanagan
 The Blade, weekly, of Fairbury
 Lincoln Courier  of Lincoln
 The State Journal-Register  of Springfield

Chicago suburbs

GateHouse's second-largest chain of weekly newspapers covers the western suburbs of Chicago. In addition to the print product, the cities and villages covered by Suburban Life Publications are also served by the hyperlocal town-by-town websites at mysuburbanlife.com. Gatehouse Media sold the chain to Dixon, Illinois-based Shaw Media Group on 1 October 2012

All of the following are weekly newspapers:

 Batavia Republican of Batavia
 Bartlett Press of Bartlett, Hanover Park and Streamwood
 Berwyn-Cicero Life of Berwyn, Cicero, Forest View and Stickney
 Bolingbrook-Romeoville Reporter of Bolingbrook and Romeoville
 Downers Grove Reporter of Downers Grove
 Elmhurst Press of Elmhurst
 The Farmside of Huntley and Marengo
 Geneva Republican of Geneva
 Glen Ellyn News of Glen Ellyn
 Lemont Reporter of Lemont
 Lisle-Naperville Reporter of Lisle and Naperville
 Lombard Spectator of Lombard
 Northeast DuPage Press of Addison, Bensenville and Wood Dale
 Northwest DuPage Press of Bloomingdale, Carol Stream, Glendale Heights, Itasca and Roselle
 St. Charles Republican of Saint Charles and Wayne
 Suburban Life of Berkeley, Broadview, Countryside, Hillside, Hodgkins, Indian Head Park, La Grange, La Grange Park, Westchester, Western Springs and Willow Springs
 Suburban Life of Brookfield, Lyons, McCook, North Riverside and Riverside
 Suburban Life of Burr Ridge, Clarendon Hills, Darien, Hinsdale, Oak Brook, Oakbrook Terrace and Willowbrook
 Villa Park Argus of Villa Park
 West DuPage Press of Warrenville, West Chicago and Winfield
 Westmont Progress of Westmont
 Wheaton Leader of Wheaton
 Woodridge Reporter of Woodridge

Northwestern Illinois
 The Journal Standard  of Freeport
 Rockford Register Star  of Rockford

Southern Illinois

Southwestern Illinois
 The Benton Evening News  of Benton
 Daily American  of West Frankfort
 Du Quoin Evening Call  of Du Quoin
 The Daily Republican  of Marion
 Randolph County weekly newspapers:
 The Randolph County Herald Tribune of Chester
 Steeleville Ledger of Steeleville
 Other weekly newspapers:
 The Ashley News of Ashley
 Christopher Progress of Christopher
 Herrin Spokesman of Herrin
 Murphysboro American of Murphysboro
Southeastern Illinois
 The Carmi Times  of Carmi
 Norris City Banner, weekly, of Norris City
 The Daily Register  of Harrisburg
 The Eldorado Daily Journal  of Eldorado
 Gallatin County weekly newspapers:
 Ridgway News of Ridgway
 Gallatin Democrat of Shawneetown

Wabash Valley
 Olney Daily Mail  of Olney
 Daily Mail Group weeklies:
 Advocate Press of Flora
 Newton Press Mentor of Newton
 Teutopolis Press of Dieterich and Teutopolis
 The Weekly Mail of Olney

Indiana 

 South Bend Tribune of South Bend, Indiana
 Times Mail of Bedford, Indiana
 Evening World of Spencer, Indiana
 The Herald-Times of Bloomington, Indiana
 The Hoosier Topics of Cloverdale, Indiana
 Reporter-Times of Martinsville, Indiana
 Mooresville-Decatur Times of Mooresville, Indiana

Iowa and Nebraska
GateHouse publishes three weekly newspapers along the Iowa-Nebraska border:
 The Hamburg Reporter of Hamburg, Iowa
 Nebraska City News-Press of Nebraska City, Nebraska
 Syracuse Journal-Democrat of Syracuse, Nebraska

Other Iowa newspapers
 Ames Tribune
 Boone News Republican
 Dallas County News
 Hamburg Reporter
 The Hawk Eye of Burlington, Iowa
 Nevada Journal
 Perry Chief
 Story City Herald, Story City, Iowa
 Tri-County Times

Kansas
GateHouse publishes 14 daily newspapers and seven weeklies in Kansas, and several shopper publications (not listed) in most of its newspaper markets:
Wichita area and central Kansas
 Butler County Times-Gazette  of El Dorado, Kansas, a merger of the former Augusta Gazette and El Dorado Times, published twice weekly.
 Andover American, weekly, of Andover, Kansas
 Hays Daily News
 The Hutchinson News
 McPherson Sentinel  of McPherson, Kansas
 The Kansan  of Newton, Kansas
 Ottawa Herald
 The Salina Journal
 Wellington Daily News  of Wellington, Kansas

Western Kansas
 Dodge City Daily Globe  of Dodge City, Kansas
 La Estrella, Spanish-language weekly, of Dodge City, Kansas
 Garden City Telegram
 Weekly newspapers:
 Kiowa County Signal, weekly, of Greensburg, Kansas
 The Pratt Tribune, tri-weekly, of Pratt, Kansas
 The St. John News, weekly, of St. John, Kansas
Kansas City area
 The Examiner  of Independence, Missouri
 Leavenworth Times  of Leavenworth, Kansas
 The Fort Leavenworth Lamp, weekly, of Fort Leavenworth
 Lansing This Week, weekly, of Lansing, Kansas

Louisiana
GateHouse publishes four daily newspapers and six weeklies in Louisiana, as well as several shopper publications (not listed):

 Baton Rouge area weeklies:
 Donaldsonville Chief of Donaldsonville
 Gonzales Weekly Citizen of Gonzales
 Plaquemine Post South of Plaquemine
 The Bastrop Daily Enterprise  of Bastrop
 Beauregard Daily News  of DeRidder
 Leesville Daily Leader  of Leesville
 Calcasieu Parish weeklies:
 The Moss Bluff News of Moss Bluff
 Southwest Daily News, tri-weekly, of Sulphur
 Vinton News of Vinton
 The Westlake News of Westlake

Maryland 

 The Herald-Mail of Hagerstown, Maryland

Massachusetts
GateHouse Media New England publishes several daily newspapers in Massachusetts, and 113 weeklies in Massachusetts, in addition to numerous shopper publications. In tandem with the print product, the cities and towns covered by GateHouse weeklies and dailies in Massachusetts are also served by the hyperlocal town-by-town websites at WickedLocal.com.

Dailies

 The Cape Cod Times of Hyannis, Massachusetts
 The Enterprise  of Brockton, Massachusetts
 The Gardner News of Gardner, Massachusetts
 The Herald News  of Fall River, Massachusetts
 O Jornal, Portuguese-language weekly, of Fall River
 The MetroWest Daily News  of Framingham, Massachusetts
 The Milford Daily News  of Milford, Massachusetts
 The Patriot Ledger  of Quincy, Massachusetts
 Taunton Daily Gazette  of Taunton, Massachusetts
 Telegram & Gazette  of Worcester, Massachusetts

Boston-area weeklies

GateHouse's largest weekly newspaper market is Massachusetts, where it owns more than 100 titles in and around Boston. Several of these newspapers cover more than one town, and WickedLocal maintains separate websites for each town. All of the following are weekly newspapers in Massachusetts:

Cape Cod

 Bourne Courier of Bourne
 The Bulletin of Falmouth and Mashpee
 The Cape Codder of Brewster, Chatham, Eastham and Orleans
 Harwich Oracle of Harwich
 Provincetown Banner of Provincetown, Truro and Wellfleet
 The Sandwich Broadsider of Sandwich
 The Register of Barnstable, Dennis and Yarmouth

Metro Boston (city neighborhoods and adjoining suburbs)

 Allston-Brighton Tab of Allston and Brighton (Boston)
 Brookline Tab of Brookline
 Cambridge Chronicle of Cambridge
 Cambridge Tab of Cambridge
 The Dedham Transcript of Dedham
 Dover-Sherborn Press of Dover and Sherborn
 Roslindale Transcript of Roslindale (Boston)
 Somerville Journal of Somerville
 Needham Times of Needham
 Newton Tab of Newton
 Waltham News Tribune of Waltham
 Watertown Tab & Press of Watertown
 The Wellesley Townsman of Wellesley
 West Roxbury Transcript of West Roxbury (Boston)

North of Boston (the Massachusetts North Shore)

 Amesbury News of Amesbury
 Beverly Citizen of Beverly
 Danvers Herald of Danvers
 Cape Ann Beacon of Gloucester (serving all of Cape Ann)
 Georgetown Record of Georgetown
 Hamilton Wenham Chronicle of Hamilton and Wenham
 Ipswich Chronicle of Ipswich
 Malden Observer of Malden
 Marblehead Reporter of Marblehead
 Medford Transcript of Medford
 Melrose Free Press of Melrose
 Newburyport Current of Newburyport and surrounding towns
 North Andover Citizen of North Andover
 North Shore Sunday of Lynn, Peabody and surrounding towns
 Salem Gazette of Salem
 Saugus Advertiser of Saugus
 Stoneham Sun of Stoneham
 Swampscott Reporter of Swampscott
 Tri-Town Transcript of Boxford, Middleton and Topsfield
 Wakefield Observer of Wakefield

Northwest of Boston (northern Middlesex County and northeastern Worcester County)

 The Arlington Advocate of Arlington
 The Beacon of Acton and Boxborough
 The Beacon-Villager of Maynard and Stow
 Bedford Minuteman of Bedford
 Belmont Citizen-Herald of Belmont
 Billerica Minuteman of Billerica
 The Bolton Common of Bolton
 Burlington Union of Burlington
 Chelmsford Independent of Chelmsford
 The Concord Journal of Concord
 The Harvard Post of Harvard
 Lexington Minuteman of Lexington
 Lincoln Journal of Lincoln
 Littleton Independent of Littleton
 Tewksbury Advocate of Tewksbury
 Times & Courier of Clinton and Lancaster
 The Reading Advocate of Reading
 Westford Eagle of Westford
 Wilmington Advocate of Wilmington
 The Winchester Star of Winchester
 Woburn Advocate of Woburn

South of Boston (the Massachusetts South Shore and South Coast)

 Abington Mariner of Abington
 Braintree Forum of Braintree
 Bridgewater Independent of Bridgewater
 Carver Reporter of Carver
 Cohasset Mariner of Cohasset
 Duxbury Reporter of Duxbury
 Halifax-Plympton Reporter of Halifax and Plympton
 Hanover Mariner of Hanover
 The Hingham Journal of Hingham
 Holbrook Sun of Holbrook
 Kingston Reporter of Kingston
 Lakeville Call of Lakeville
 Marshfield Mariner of Marshfield
 Norwell Mariner of Norwell
 Old Colony Memorial of Plymouth
 Pembroke Mariner-Reporter of Pembroke
 Randolph Herald of Randolph
 Raynham Call of Raynham
 Rockland Standard of Rockland
 Scituate Mariner of Scituate
 The Sentinel of Marion, Mattapoisett and Rochester
 Wareham Courier of Wareham
 Weymouth News of Weymouth

West of Boston (MetroWest, with adjacent portions of Bristol and Norfolk counties)

 Ashland Tab of Ashland
 Canton Journal of Canton
 The Country Gazette of Franklin and surrounding towns
 Easton Journal of Easton
 Framingham Tab of Framingham
 Holliston Tab of Holliston
 Hopkinton Crier of Hopkinton
 Hudson Sun of Hudson
 Mansfield News of Mansfield
 Marlborough Enterprise of Marlborough
 Medfield Press of Medfield
 Natick Bulletin & Tab of Natick
 The North Attleborough Free Press of North Attleborough
 Norton Mirror of Norton
 Norwood Bulletin of Norwood
 Sharon Advocate of Sharon
 Shrewsbury Chronicle of Shrewsbury
 Stoughton Journal of Stoughton
 The Sudbury Town Crier of Sudbury
 The Villager of Northborough and Southborough
 The Wayland Town Crier of Wayland
 The Westborough News of Westborough
 The Weston Town Crier of Weston
 Westwood Press of Westwood

Michigan 
GateHouse publishes nine dailies and four weekly newspapers in Michigan, plus several shoppers (not listed) related to its newspaper properties:

 Cheboygan Daily Tribune  of Cheboygan
 Bronson Journal, weekly, of Bronson
 The Daily Reporter  of Coldwater
 The Daily Telegram  of Adrian
 The Evening News  of Sault Ste. Marie
 Hillsdale Daily News  of Hillsdale
 The Holland Sentinel  of Holland
 Ionia Sentinel-Standard  of Ionia
 Jonesville Independent, weekly, of Jonesville
 Mackinac Journal, weekly, of Cheboygan
 Monroe News, daily, of Monroe
 Sturgis Journal  of Sturgis
 West Michigan Senior Times, weekly, of Kalamazoo
 Petoskey News-Review, daily, of Petoskey
 Charlevoix Courier, weekly, of Charlevoix
 Gaylord Herald Times, weekly, of Gaylord

Minnesota
GateHouse publishes one daily newspaper and nine weeklies in Minnesota, in addition to several shoppers (not listed) associated with its newspaper properties:

 Crookston Daily Times  of Crookston
 Granite Falls Advocate Tribune, weekly, of Granite Falls
 Montevideo American-News, weekly, of Montevideo
 Redwood Falls Gazette, weekly, of Redwood Falls
 Redwood Falls Livewire, weekly, of Redwood Falls
 The Sleepy Eye Herald Dispatch, weekly, of Sleepy Eye
 St. James Plaindealer, weekly, of St. James
 Tri-County News, weekly, of Cottonwood
 The Valley Journal, weekly, of Halstad
 The Wabasso Standard, weekly, of Wabasso

Missouri
GateHouse publishes 13 dailies and eight weeklies in Missouri, in addition to several shoppers (not listed) associated with its newspaper properties:

Northern Missouri
 Boonville Daily News  of Boonville, Missouri
 Chillicothe Constitution-Tribune  of Chillicothe, Missouri
 Hannibal Courier-Post  of Hannibal, Missouri
 Kirksville Daily Express  of Kirksville, Missouri
 Linn County Leader, tri-weekly, of Brookfield, Missouri
 Macon Chronicle-Herald  of Macon, Missouri
 The Mexico Ledger  of Mexico, Missouri
 Moberly Monitor-Index  of Moberly, Missouri

Central Missouri
 The Columbia Daily Tribune  of Columbia, Missouri

Southern Missouri
 The Daily Guide  of Waynesville, Missouri
 Lake Sun Leader  of Camdenton, Missouri
 Lake Area News Focus, weekly, of Osage Beach, Missouri
 WestSide Star, weekly, of Laurie, Missouri
 The Rolla Daily News  of Rolla, Missouri
 St. James Leader-Journal, weekly, of St. James, Missouri

Four State Area (Joplin area)
 The Carthage Press  of Carthage, Missouri
 The Morning Sun  of Pittsburg, Kansas
 Weekly newspapers:
 The Aurora Advertiser of Aurora, Missouri
 Girard Press of Girard, Kansas
 The Vedette of Greenfield, Missouri

New Jersey
 New Jersey Herald, Sunday-Friday, of Newton, New Jersey
 Burlington County Times, Sunday-Friday, of Westampton, New Jersey

New York
GateHouse publishes eight daily newspapers and 13 weeklies in Upstate New York, as well as several shopper publications (not listed) associated with its newspaper properties:

Genesee Valley and Southern Tier
 Evening Tribune  of Hornell
 The Leader  of Corning
 Wellsville Daily Reporter  of Wellsville
 Weekly newspapers:
 The Chronicle-Express of Penn Yan
 Genesee Country Express of Dansville
 Steuben Courier of Bath

Mohawk Valley
 Observer-Dispatch  of Utica
 Mid-York Weekly of Hamilton
 The Times Telegram

Rochester area
 Daily Messenger  of Canandaigua
 Messenger Post Newspapers weeklies:
 Brighton-Pittsford Post of Brighton and Pittsford
 Fairport-East Rochester Post of East Rochester, Fairport and Perinton
 Gates-Chili Post of Chili and Gates
 Greece Post of Greece
 Irondequoit Post of Irondequoit
 Penfield Post of Penfield
 Rush-Henrietta Post of Henrietta and Rush
 Victor Post of Farmington and Victor
 Wayne Post of Palmyra and Wayne County

Ulster County
 Saugerties Post Star, weekly, of Saugerties

North Dakota
 Devils Lake Daily Journal  of Devils Lake, North Dakota

Ohio
GateHouse publishes four dailies, numerous weeklies, along with assorted shoppers and specialty publications (not all listed), in Franklin, Delaware, Licking, Fairfield, Union, Summit County and Tuscarawas counties, in Ohio:

Akron Beacon Journal of Akron
The Columbus Dispatch  of Columbus
The Daily Jeffersonian of Cambridge
The Daily Record of Wooster
ThisWeek Newspapers  of Columbus
Columbus Monthly  of Columbus
The Independent  of Massillon
The Repository  of Canton
 The Suburbanite, weekly, of Green and south suburban Akron
The Times-Reporter  of Dover-New Philadelphia

Oklahoma
GateHouse publishes five daily, four weekly and five shopper newspapers in Oklahoma:
 Bartlesville Examiner-Enterprise  of Bartlesville
 Miami News-Record  of Miami
 The Ardmoreite  of Ardmore
 The Journal Record of Oklahoma City
 The Oklahoman of Oklahoma City
 The Shawnee News-Star  of Shawnee
 Delaware County Journal Grove, weekly, of Delaware County
 Grove Sun, weekly, of Grove
 Pawhuska Journal-Capital, weekly, of Pawhuska
 Friday Gazette, weekly, of McLoud

Oregon
GateHouse publishes one daily newspaper in Oregon:
 The Register-Guard, daily, of Eugene, Oregon

Pennsylvania and West Virginia
GateHouse publishes three daily newspapers and three weeklies in Pennsylvania, and one of each in West Virginia, clustered in two groups of four:

Scranton area
 The Wayne Independent  of Honesdale, Pennsylvania
 Carbondale News, weekly, of Carbondale, Pennsylvania
 The News Eagle, weekly, of Hawley, Pennsylvania
 The Villager, weekly, of Moscow, Pennsylvania
South Central Pennsylvania and West Virginia
 Echo Pilot, weekly, of Greencastle, Pennsylvania
 The Jackson Herald, weekly, of Ripley, West Virginia
 Mineral Daily News Tribune  of Keyser, West Virginia
 The Record Herald  of Waynesboro, Pennsylvania

Other Pennsylvania newspapers 

Pocono Record, daily, of Stroudsburg, Pennsylvania
Erie Times-News, daily, of Erie, Pennsylvania
Daily American of Somerset, Pennsylvania

Rhode Island
Gatehouse media publishes two daily newspapers, two weekly publications, and one monthly and one bi-monthly magazines in Rhode Island.  On October 26, 2017, Gatehouse media acquired Edward A. Sherman Publishing that included a daily newspaper, a commercial printing division, and three monthly publications based out of Newport. 

 The Providence Journal of Providence, Rhode Island
 Rhode Island Lawyers Weekly of Providence, Rhode Island
 A La Carte TMC, a weekly shopper publication Providence, Rhode Island
 The Newport Daily News of Newport, Rhode Island
 Newport Life Magazine bi-monthly, of Newport, Rhode Island
 Mercury, a publication of The Newport Daily News

South Dakota 

 The American News of Aberdeen, South Dakota
Watertown Public Opinion of Watertown, South Dakota

Tennessee
 The Oak Ridger  of Oak Ridge, Tennessee

Texas
GateHouse publishes seven daily, 11 weekly and 13 shopper newspapers in Texas:

Amarillo Globe-News, daily, of Amarillo
Austin American-Statesman, daily, of Austin
Brownwood Bulletin, daily, of Brownwood
Lubbock Avalanche-Journal, daily, of Lubbock
The Herald Democrat, daily, of Sherman and Denison
Stephenville Empire-Tribune, daily, of Stephenville
Waxahachie Daily Light, daily, of Waxahachie
Alice Echo-News Journal, weekly, of Alice
Anna-Melissa Tribune, weekly, of Anna and Melissa
Ballinger Ledger, weekly, of Ballinger
Duval County Press, weekly, of Duval County
Freer Press, weekly, of Freer
Glen Rose Reporter, weekly, of Glen Rose
Midlothian Mirror, weekly, of Midlothian
Nueces County Record Star, weekly, of Robstown
Prosper Press, weekly, of Prosper
Van Alstyne Leader, weekly, of Van Alstyne
Winters Enterpise, weekly, of Winters

Virginia

 The Progress-Index, daily, of Petersburg, Virginia
 Virginia Lawyers Weekly, paid weekly, of Richmond, Virginia
 Colonial Voice, a weekly shopper, of Richmond, Virginia

References

External links
 
 Official GateHouse Media website
 Official GateHouse Media website list of newspapers

Lists of newspapers by newspaper company
Mass media in Alaska
Mass media in Arkansas
Mass media in California
Mass media in Colorado
Mass media in Connecticut
Mass media in Delaware
Mass media in Illinois
Mass media in Indiana
Mass media in Kansas
Mass media in Louisiana
Mass media in Maryland
Mass media in Massachusetts
Mass media in Michigan
Mass media in Minnesota
Mass media in Missouri
Mass media in Nebraska
Mass media in New York (state)
Mass media in North Dakota
Mass media in Ohio
Mass media in Oklahoma
Mass media in Oregon
Mass media in Pennsylvania
Mass media in Rhode Island
Mass media in South Dakota
Mass media in Tennessee
Mass media in West Virginia